Ixeris is a genus of Asian flowering plants in the family Asteraceae.

Concepts of which species should be included in the genus have changed in recent years because of the use of molecular investigations. Numerous species formerly regarded as members of Ixeris have been moved to other genera; (Agoseris, Crepidiastrum, Ixeridium, Lactuca, Paraixeris, Paraprenanthes,  Sonchella or Youngia). Species remaining in Ixeris  or of uncertain affiliations are listed below.

 Species

References

Asteraceae genera
Cichorieae
Taxa named by Henri Cassini